Project Dream was the codename of a role-playing video game (RPG), Dream: Land of Giants, that served as the basis for the 1998 game Banjo-Kazooie. Developed by Rare, it was aimed for release on the Super Nintendo Entertainment System (SNES), and later the Nintendo 64 (N64). The plot followed a young boy, Edson, who caused trouble with pirates. The SNES version of Dream used an isometric perspective and had a fairy tale theme. After transitioning to the N64, the project became a more complex 3D RPG that had a greater emphasis on the pirate theme. Eventually, Dream was scaled back to a linear platform game in the vein of Donkey Kong Country (1994) that starred Banjo the bear, who became the protagonist of Banjo-Kazooie.

The game was developed by Rare's Donkey Kong Country 2: Diddy's Kong Quest (1995) team over 16 months. It was inspired by Japanese RPGs and LucasArts adventure games, and the name Dream emphasized its fantastical themes. Dream was not completed because Rare believed it was too ambitious and different from their previous games. The game that became Conker's Bad Fur Day (2001) led them to retool it into a platformer inspired by Nintendo’s Super Mario 64. The Dream concepts were re-integrated into Banjo-Kazooie, which released to critical and commercial success.

Premise

During most of its development period, Project Dream was a role-playing video game (RPG) that focused on a boy named Edson and his pets Dinger the dog and Billy the parrot. In its story, a band of pirates led by Captain Blackeye searched for "floaty", a substance that would allow their ships to fly. Edson got into trouble with the pirates and set off on a journey with his girlfriend to escape them. The Super Nintendo Entertainment System (SNES) version of the game employed an isometric perspective and had a fairy tale theme. Edson used a wooden sword to fight trolls and Dinger performed actions to assist him, such as going ahead and digging holes to find items. Occasionally, a dinosaur would appear and attempt to crush Edson by stepping on him; falling leaves and the virtual camera system shaking warned the player when it was approaching.

When development transitioned to the Nintendo 64 (N64), Dream became a larger RPG rendered in 3D computer graphics. The pirate theme became more dominant than the fairy tale one. As development progressed on the N64, the game went through radical changes. Edson was replaced twice, first by a rabbit and later by Banjo the bear, who became the main character of Banjo-Kazooie. The final version of the game was a linear platformer in the vein of Rare's Donkey Kong Country games, and bore little resemblance to the earlier versions.

Development
After Nintendo released the SNES, Rare used the profits they made from Nintendo Entertainment System games to invest in Silicon Graphics workstations. Rare used this high-end technology to develop Donkey Kong Country (1994), which was a critical and commercial success, becoming the second  bestselling SNES game behind Super Mario World (1990). After finishing Donkey Kong Country, Rare staff decided to apply the technology to a new game that was not a platformer. They settled on developing a RPG, as they were all fans of the genre. The codename Dream was chosen because they wanted their RPG to have a fantastical, magical feel. Dream used Donkey Kong Countrys graphics technology to an advanced level. It was inspired by Japanese RPGs and LucasArts adventure games; the team wanted to combine those games to create one with a "Rare flavour". Dream was developed by Rare's Donkey Kong Country 2: Diddy's Kong Quest (1995) team and was announced in 1995.

As development progressed, the team felt it was too large for an SNES cartridge and the introduction of the N64 rendered the Silicon Graphics technology obsolete. Thus, Rare made the decision to switch development to the N64. After this transition, the fantasy theme gradually was dropped. According to Rare's Gregg Mayles, the team did not want the game to be too childish. They brought the pirate theme from Diddy’s Kong Quest, as Rare staff felt they "could have a lot of fun with it" and believed it would have a broad appeal due to Mayles’ love of the Golden Age of Piracy. While some aspects were kept in the transition to the N64, Dream became a much larger RPG. As the game changed, Rare began to feel Edson was losing his relevance and began looking for an alternate protagonist. He was replaced with the rabbit and eventually Banjo. The decision to use Banjo, who was already in the game as a minor side character, was made by Rare cofounder Tim Stamper. Banjo was designed to have human qualities and was given a backpack to put items in.

Some time passed, and the team began to believe the game was too ambitious and different from their previous games. They also could not find how it would be enjoyable to play. Composer Grant Kirkhope noted Rare struggled to get the game running at a decent frame rate. Meanwhile, another Rare team was working on what would become Conker's Bad Fur Day (2001), a platformer. Impressed by how this game was looking, the Dream team retooled their game into a Donkey Kong Country-esque platformer, something they felt more comfortable with. At this point, few elements from earlier incarnations remained. Overall, Dream was in development for sixteen months and development restarted four times. The soundtrack was primarily composed by Kirkhope; David Wise also contributed but left partway through development to compose Diddy Kong Racing (1997). Kirkhope wrote 107 tracks with "strong" themes. Some were reused in later games Kirkhope scored.

Aftermath and legacy
When Dream staff saw Nintendo's Super Mario 64 (1996), they realized it was going to set the standard for 3D games and ruin their project. They scrapped their work on Dream and began developing a new game inspired by Super Mario 64. Banjo was kept because the team liked the character. The fantasy theme was restored, and within another 16 months, Rare had finished Banjo-Kazooie. The game was released in 1998 and was a commercial success, topping the United Kingdom all-format charts—a feat a Rare game did not accomplish again until its 30th anniversary game Rare Replay in 2015—and attracted critical acclaim. The antagonist of Dream, Captain Blackeye, has cameo appearances in Banjo-Kazooie and its sequel Banjo-Tooie (2000); in Tooie, he gripes about how a bear stole his glory, referencing the development of Dream. Numerous assets from Dream were also reused in Banjo-Kazooie. Dreams pirate theme was eventually recycled in Rare's 2018 game Sea of Thieves. GamesRadar+ expressed relief Dream became Banjo-Kazooie, believing it would have been a "snoozefest" if it had not been retooled.

For many years, little was known about Dream. Only a few images of the game were released, although Kirkhope revealed some information about it on his blog. In May 2015, Tim Stamper confirmed fan speculation that he was in possession of a prototype version. The following December, Rare released "Rare Revealed: A Rare Look at Dream", a short documentary about the making of Dream, on their YouTube channel to promote the release of Rare Replay. The video features developer commentary from Rare staff that worked on the game, as well as previously unreleased gameplay footage.

References

Banjo-Kazooie
Cancelled Nintendo 64 games
Cancelled Super Nintendo Entertainment System games
Nintendo games
Rare (company) games
Role-playing video games
Video games scored by David Wise
Video games scored by Grant Kirkhope